Marie Charles Louis d'Albert de Luynes (24 April 1717 – 8 October 1771) was a French nobleman and member of the House of Albert. He was the fifth Duke of Luynes as well as Duke of Chevreuse.

Early life
Luynes was born on 24 April 1717 in Paris at the Hôtel de Luynes on the rue Saint Dominique. He was the only child of Charles Philippe d'Albert de Luynes and his wife Louise Léontine de Bourbon, he was styled the duc de Chevreuse while his father was alive. Charles Louis was the titular Duke of Montfort. Through his mother, a granddaughter of Louis Henri de Bourbon who was an illegitimate son of the Count of Soissons, Charles Louis was also the claimant to the Principality of Neuchâtel in modern-day Switzerland.

His parents were great friends of Queen Marie Leszczyńska, consort of Louis XV of France. At his father's death in 1758, he succeeded to the title of Duke of Luynes.

Career

He took part in the war in 1733 in the War of the Polish Succession. He also took part in campaigns in 1735 and 1745, the latter in the War of the Austrian Succession, and was injured in combat at Sahay at the head of the Dragoons. He participated in the attack of Prague in 1742, and also assisted in various sieges and battles of the era.

In 1754, he was created a Colonel General of the Dragoons. From 1757 to 1771, he was the Gouverneur de Paris (Military governor of Paris), an ancient and prestigious rank representing the king in the capital. He also was created a Knight of the Order of the Holy Spirit at Versailles on 2 February 1759.

Personal life
The Duke married twice. His first marriage was to Thérèse Pélagie d'Albert on 22 January 1735; they had no issue.

After the death of his first wife, he married, secondly, to Henriette Nicole d'Egmont-Pignatelli on 27 April 1738 with whom he had three children with:

 Charles Marie Léopold d'Albert de Luynes, Count of Dunois (1740–1758), who died unmarried.
 Marie Paule Angélique d'Albert de Luynes (1744–1781) married her cousin Louis Joseph d'Albert d'Ailly, 7th Duke of Chaulnes.
 Louis Joseph Charles Amable d'Albert de Luynes, Duke of Luynes (1748–1807), who married Guyonne Élisabeth de Montmorency-Laval (aunt of Mathieu de Montmorency) and had issue.

He died in Paris in his hôtel. He was buried at the Chapelle de Saint Jean l'Évangeliste at the Église Saint-Sulpice, Paris.

Ancestry

References

1717 births
1771 deaths
Charles Louis
Dukes of Chevreuse
House of Albert
French military personnel of the War of the Polish Succession
Military governors of Paris
French Army officers
Burials at Saint-Sulpice, Paris
18th-century peers of France